Paloduro is a small unincorporated community in Armstrong County, Texas, United States. In 2000, the population was ten. The community is part of the Amarillo, Texas Metropolitan Statistical Area.

History
Paloduro served as the headquarters of the JA Ranch, and most of its residents are associated with it. It was named for the Palo Duro Canyon, in which it lies. The area was used by Native Americans and buffalo hunters sometime before the 1870s. A post office was established at Paloduro in November 1882 and remained in operation until 1954. Charles Goodnight established the JA Ranch in the community. Some homesteaders came to the area after a law passed in 1887 to allow them to purchase a plot of farmland, which equaled three sections of grazing land. The post office in Bissell, which opened in 1893, joined with the Paloduro post office in 1897. The community declined when an Indian scare, a blizzard in 1898, and purchases of small plots of land by the ranch occurred in the area and land cultivation reverted to pastures. Mail delivery to the community was transferred to Clarendon. Its population was 30 in 1970. It continued to be controlled by the JA Ranch during the 1980s. Paloduro had a supply store and several ranch outhouses. There was one building, a JA Ranch milk and meat cooler, that moved to Lubbock in the 1970s and became a part of the National Ranching Heritage Center at Texas Tech University. Its population was 10 in 2000.

Geography
Paloduro is located off Farm to Market Road 2272 between the drainage basin of Mulberry Creek and the Prairie Dog Town Fork Red River in southeastern Armstrong County.

Education
The school's first community was established in 1891 and was named for range manager John E. Farrington. It was later renamed Mulberry Flat School. It joined the school in Mount Pleasant in 1937. Today, the community is served by the Claude Independent School District.

References

Unincorporated communities in Armstrong County, Texas
Unincorporated communities in Texas
Unincorporated communities in Amarillo metropolitan area